Military terminology refers to the terms and language of military organizations and personnel as belonging to a discrete category. As distinguishable by their usage in military doctrine, they serve to depoliticise, dehumanise, or otherwise abstract discussion about its operations from an actual description thereof.

Common understanding
The operational pressure for uniform understanding has developed since the early 20th century with the importance of joint operations between different services (army, navy, air force) of the same country. International alliances and operations, including peacekeeping, have added additional complexity. For example, the NATO alliance now maintains a large dictionary of common terms for use by member countries. Development work is also taking place between NATO and Russia on common terminology for extended air defence, in English, French and Russian.

Criticism
Some claim military terms serve to depoliticise, dehumanize, or otherwise abstract discussion about operations from an actual description thereof. 
Similar to "legal terminology" and related to "political terminology", military terms are known for an oblique tendency to incorporate technical language. In many cases, it reflects a need to be precise. It can also reflect a perceived need for operational security, giving away no more information than needed. It can also serve to disguise or distort meaning as with doublespeak. "Kinetic activity" as a buzzword for combat, in use since the inception of the War on Terror, has been criticized as a don’t-ask-don’t-tell policy for murder.

See also
:Category:Military terminology
Glossary of German military terms
Glossary of military abbreviations
List of established military terms

Notes

External links
Glossary of Military Terms & Slang from the Vietnam War

 
Military science
Warfare